Khvor-e Vosta (also Romanized as Khvor-e Vosţá and Khūr-e Vosţá; also known as Khowr-e Meyānī, Khaur, Khowr, Khūr, and Khūr-e Vasaţī) is a village in Tabadkan Rural District, in the Central District of Mashhad County, Razavi Khorasan Province, Iran. At the 2006 census, its population was 93, in 21 families.

References 

Populated places in Mashhad County